Haliotis scalaris, common name the staircase abalone or the ridged ear abalone, is a species of sea snail, a marine gastropod mollusk in the family Haliotidae, the abalones.

Subspecies
 Haliotis scalaris emmae Reeve, 1846
 Haliotis scalaris scalaris (Leach, 1814)

Description
The size of the shell varies between 60 mm and 100 mm. "The depressed shell has a rounded-oval shape, showing a strong spiral rib on each side of the row of 5 to 6 open perforations, and prominent elevated radiating lamellae around the spire. The shell is moderately large but thin, of the depressed, irregularly oval shape. Its color pattern is reddish or variegated olive and green. The surface has a strong rounded ridge inside of the row of elevated tubular holes, and a smaller, nodose ridge outside of it. Above it is finely striated spirally, and with  coarse raised lamellae between the spire and the inner spiral rib. Its inner surface is silvery and very iridescent, with excavations corresponding to the elevations of the outer surface. The columellar plate is narrow, and obliquely truncated below."

Distribution
This marine species is endemic to Australia and occurs from South West (Western Australia) to Victoria including Tasmania.

References

 Wilson, B. 1993. Australian Marine Shells. Prosobranch Gastropods. Kallaroo, Western Australia : Odyssey Publishing Vol. 1 408 pp. [
 Geiger D.L. & Poppe G.T. (2000). A Conchological Iconography: The family Haliotidae. Conchbooks, Hackenheim Germany. 135pp  83pls
 Geiger D.L. & Owen B. (2012) Abalone: Worldwide Haliotidae. Hackenheim: Conchbooks. viii + 361 pp.

External links
 

scalaris
Gastropods of Australia
Gastropods described in 1814